Ginger's is a cash only, dive lesbian bar in Brooklyn's Park Slope neighborhood, and as of 2020 was the borough's last remaining lesbian bar and one of two queer bars in Park Slope following the closure of Excelsior. The bar is owned by Sheila Frayne and opened in 2000 when Park Slope was a lesbian mecca, although it is seen as both a lesbian bar and a woman-friendly neighborhood bar.

Ginger's survived the COVID-19 shutdown despite other challenges with which they were already struggling including gentrification, shifts in nightlife trends, and other changes in the neighborhood.

See also
Lesbian Bar Project

References

2000 establishments in New York City
Bars (establishments)
LGBT drinking establishments in New York City
LGBT nightclubs in New York (state)
Park Slope
Women in New York City